Ubiquitin carboxyl-terminal hydrolase 8 is an enzyme that in humans is encoded by the USP8 gene.

Interactions 

USP8 has been shown to interact with RNF41 and STAM2.

References

Further reading